Místo is a municipality and village in Chomutov District in the Ústí nad Labem Region of the Czech Republic. It has about 400 inhabitants.

Administrative parts
Villages of Blahuňov and Vysoká Jedle are administrative parts of Místo.

References

Villages in Chomutov District
Villages in the Ore Mountains